Evergreen School District may refer to:

 Evergreen Elementary School District in San Jose, California
 Evergreen Local School District in Fulton County, Ohio
 Evergreen Public Schools in Clark County, Washington
 Evergreen School District No. 50 in Evergreen, Montana
 Evergreen Park Community High School District 231 in Evergreen Park, Illinois
 Evergreen Park Elementary School District 124 in Evergreen Park, Illinois

See also 
 Evergreen School (disambiguation)
 Evergreen High School (disambiguation)